The J. W. Cox Dry Goods Store was a historic commercial building located at Seaford, Sussex County, Delaware. It was built about 1885, and was a two-story, four bay, frame structure with a front gable roof.  It had commercial space in the front and living space in the rear.  It featured its original showcase windows and doors.

It was added to the National Register of Historic Places in 1987.

References

Commercial buildings on the National Register of Historic Places in Delaware
Commercial buildings completed in 1885
Buildings and structures in Sussex County, Delaware
Seaford, Delaware
National Register of Historic Places in Sussex County, Delaware